Saturday Drama (formerly The Saturday Play) is a regular feature on BBC Radio 4 and is described as "Thrillers, mysteries, love stories and detective fiction, as well as an occasional special series."

References

External links

BBC Radio 4 programmes